NGC 3132 (also known as the Eight-Burst Nebula, the Southern Ring Nebula, or Caldwell 74) is a bright and extensively studied planetary nebula in the constellation Vela.  Its distance from Earth is estimated at about 613 pc. or 2,000 light-years.

The Southern Ring Nebula was selected as one of the five cosmic objects observed by the James Webb Space Telescope as part of the release of its first official science images on July 12, 2022.

Planetary nebula nucleus (PNN)
Images of NGC 3132 reveal two stars close together within the nebulosity, one of 10th magnitude, the other 16th, located about 1.7″ away from the central star. The central star of the planetary nebula is a white dwarf, and is the fainter of the two stars. This hot central star of about 100,000 K has now blown off its outer layers and is making the nebula fluoresce brightly from the emission of its intense ultraviolet radiation. The 16th magnitude star is an A-type main-sequence star of type A2V, and is separated from the white dwarf by at least 1277 au. The A-type star orbits at roughly the same distance as the edge of a dust cloud surrounding the central white dwarf.

See also
List of NGC objects
List of planetary nebulae

References

External links

 Hubble Heritage release – A Glowing Pool of Light
 Hubble Heritage Project – Image of NGC 3132
 

Planetary nebulae
Vela (constellation)
3132
074b
18350302